Hadogenes is a genus of African scorpions (including the world's longest, Hadogenes troglodytes). This genus is distinguished by its members which have an unusually flat overall appearance that allows them to quickly get in and out of the cracks and cervices that are generally abundant in their rocky habitats.  Occurring in South Africa, Namibia, Botswana, Zimbabwe and Mozambique. Members of the genus also have special claws on their tarsus which allows them specialized maneuverability in their environments. The members of this genus have demonstrated an inability to travel across the sand and will perish in the heat when unable to find shelter for extended periods of time. The members of this genus are threatened by habitat loss due to mining as well and by poaching for the exotic pet trade.

Members 
 Hadogenes bicolor Purcell, 1899
 Hadogenes gracilis Hewitt, 1909
 Hadogenes granulatus Purcell, 1901
 Hadogenes gunningi Purcell, 1899
 Hadogenes hahni Peters, 1862
 Hadogenes lawrencei Newlands, 1972
 Hadogenes longimanus Prendini, 2001
 Hadogenes minor Purcell, 1899
 Hadogenes newlandsi Prendini, 2001
 Hadogenes paucidens Pocock, 1896
 Hadogenes phyllodes Thorell, 1876
 Hadogenes polytrichobothrius Prendini, 2006
 Hadogenes soutpansbergensis Prendini, 2006
 Hadogenes tityrus Simon, 1888
 Hadogenes trichiurus Gervais, 1843
 Hadogenes troglodytes Peters, 1861
 Hadogenes zuluanus Lawrence, 1937
 Hadogenes zumpti Newlands & Cantrell, 1985

References

Hormuridae
Scorpion genera
Scorpions of Africa